César Benetti  (March 7, 1924 – June 16, 2014) was an Argentine swimmer who competed at the 1948 Summer Olympics in the 200 m breaststroke.

References

1924 births
2014 deaths
Swimmers at the 1948 Summer Olympics
Olympic swimmers of Argentina
Argentine male swimmers
Male breaststroke swimmers
20th-century Argentine people